Chronically Metropolitan is a 2016 American comedy-drama film directed by Xavier Manrique and written by Nicholas Schutt. The film stars Ashley Benson, Shiloh Fernandez, Addison Timlin, Mary-Louise Parker and Chris Noth. Filming began on February 23, 2015, in New York City.

Cast
 Shiloh Fernandez as Fenton
 Ashley Benson as Jessie
 Addison Timlin as Layla
 Mary-Louise Parker as Annabel
 Chris Noth as Christopher
 Josh Peck as John

Production
It was first announced on January 29, 2015, that Jamin O'Brien and Daniel L. Blanc would produce the film.

Filming
Filming began on February 23, 2015, in New York City, where actors were spotted filming around Manhattan. Later in March, filming was taking place on location in Brooklyn.

Reception

Critical response
On review aggregator Rotten Tomatoes the film has a rating of 40% based on 10 reviews and an average rating of 6.12/10.

References

External links
 
 

2016 films
2016 comedy-drama films
2016 directorial debut films
2016 independent films
2010s coming-of-age comedy-drama films
American coming-of-age comedy-drama films
American independent films
Films about dysfunctional families
Films about writers
Films set in New York City
Films shot in New York City
2010s English-language films
2010s American films